Abdul Aziz bin Taha (born 1 April 1936) was the third governor of the Central Bank of Malaysia from July 1980 to June 1986.

Honours
 :
 Officer of the Order of the Defender of the Realm (K.M.N.) (1973)
 Companion of the Order of the Defender of the Realm (J.M.N.) (1978)
 Commander of the Order of Loyalty to the Crown of Malaysia (P.S.M.) - Tan Sri (1982)
 :
 Knight Companion of the Order of Loyalty of Sultan Ismail of Johor (D.S.I.J.) - Dato’
 Knight Grand Commander of the Order of the Crown of Johor (S.P.M.J.) - Dato’

References 

 

1936 births
Living people
Governors of the Central Bank of Malaysia
Commanders of the Order of Loyalty to the Crown of Malaysia
Officers of the Order of the Defender of the Realm
Companions of the Order of the Defender of the Realm
Knights Grand Commander of the Order of the Crown of Johor